Robert Hyde (c. 1562 – 1642) was an English politician.

He was a Member (MP) of the Parliament of England for Chippenham in 1584 and 1586, and for Great Bedwyn in 1614.

References

1560s births
1642 deaths
English MPs 1584–1585
English MPs 1586–1587
English MPs 1614